Mrs. & Mr. Shameem is a 2022 Zindagi original Pakistani web series released on ZEE5 on 11 March 2022. It is written by Saji Gul and directed by Kashif Nisar who co-produced it with Misbah Shafique. The web series stars Naumaan Ijaz and Saba Qamar in leading roles.

Plot
Umaina is an independent woman, living in a hostel in Lahore.  Shameem is Umaina’s friend’s older brother. The community makes fun of Shameem for being effeminate. Umaina becomes pregnant with her boyfriend Bilal, who refuses to marry her and tells her to abort the child. People in the community and her family reject her, and she’s kicked out of the hostel she lives in. Shameem brings her home and proposes marriage to her.

Cast
 Naumaan Ijaz as Shameem “Shammo”
 Saba Qamar as Umaina "Ummi"
 Gul-e-Rana as Bay Ji
 Faiza Gillani as Rukhsana
 Amna Malick as Wajeeha
 Samia Butt as Salma
 Ali Azad as Salma’s husband 
 Saqib Sumeer as Khurram
 Uzma Hassan as Humaira
 Ahmad Hassan as Tony
 Haseeb Khan as Abdullah
 Agha Mustafa as Bilal
 Irfan Khoosat as Umaina’s father
 Anjum Habibi as Abbasi
 Aleeza Fatima as Fatima

Production
The web series was announced in May 2019 with the title of Mann Jogi and Ijaz and Qamar as the main leads. The shooting for the series started in September 2019 in inner Lahore. Talking about the story writer Saji Gul told to The News, "The web series is about a couple who doesn't conform to gender roles and expectations," he also revealed that Ijaz will played an effeminate yet straight character. In July 2020, it announced that the series will be released on ZEE5 while in January 2021, Qamar informed through her Instagram account that shooting for the series has been completed. In early 2022, the series was retitled as Mrs and Mr Shameem and the released date of 11 March 2022 was announced. The official trailer was released on 2 March 2022, which received positive reviews.

Soundtrack

References

External links
 
 
 Original Soundtrack at JioSaavn

Pakistani web series
2022 web series debuts
ZEE5 original programming